Shake, Rattle & Roll XI (stylized as Shake Rattle & Ro11) is a 2009 Filipino supernatural horror anthology film produced by Regal Entertainment, and the eleventh installment of the Shake, Rattle & Roll film series. It is also directed by Jessel Monteverde, Rico Gutierrez and Don Michael Perez.

The film features an ensemble cast including Ruffa Gutierrez, Mark Anthony Fernandez, Maja Salvador, Rayver Cruz, Zoren Legaspi, Iya Villania, Jennica Garcia and Mart Escudero.

It was also distributed by Regal Entertainment, Inc. and Regal Multimedia, Inc. It was an official entry in the 2009 Metro Manila Film Festival. The film received the Festival Award for Best Make-up.

The twelfth installment, Shake, Rattle and Roll 12, was released in 2010.

Plot

"Diablo"
Claire (Maja Salvador), an unfaithful and troubled intern doctor, is assigned to treat a young girl with a deadly flu virus. Upon entering the room, the girl mistreats Claire when she tries to treat her. Before leaving, the girl begs Claire that she needs a priest to cure her, but Claire doesn't believe her and assures her that she is sick. The girl angrily shouts at her and tells Claire that she has been possessed by a demon. The girl begins to attack Claire, but she attempts to escape and helplessly watches the girl fall out of the hospital to her death before the girl shifts her face to Claire's.

Claire lived an unhappy life after her family were murdered by thieves, and now lives with her religious aunt Beth. Before she sleeps, she remembers her family and suffers a nightmare of the possessed girl. The next morning she began to act strangely, hearing mysterious voices and seeing ominous visions around her before she watches Ronnie (Mark Anthony Fernandez), Claire's former boyfriend who is now a priest, performing mass. She even tries to convince her boyfriend Jake about her story before she mistreats him. Later before Jake leaves, he accidentally bumps on a girl, but this turns out to be the possessed girl and she kills Jake.

Dr. Yulo visits Beth and discusses Claire's condition. Beth tells her about Claire's behavior and attitude; Dr. Yulo assures her that she was emotionally repressed. When Dr. Yulo enters her room and speaks to Claire about her behavior, she loses control of herself that she was possessed by a diablo (the Filipino word for a demon) and attacks Dr. Yulo, who escapes as Beth watches in horror. Beth calls for Ronnie with Fr. Paul to have an exorcism for Claire but the entrance is blocked by a large mound of Catholic statues.

Before arriving at the house, they are attacked by a possessed Claire but Fr. Paul manages to say the prayers before Claire collapses. Ronnie begins to exorcise the demon in Claire's body, but fails. The demonized Claire attacks Ronnie but he manages to save himself. The Diablo insults him about his relationship with Claire but Ronnie tells Claire to fight herself. Claire manages to save herself from the demon and begs Ronnie to save her. The Diablo begins to release from Claire until shards of wood and glass fly towards Ronnie, pinning him to the wall. The Diablo vanishes from Claire but Ronnie dies from his injuries as Claire mourns his death.

Claire becomes heartbroken and guilty after Ronnie is gone and thus she changes her life. Later, Claire returns to work and begins treating a little girl. The little girl's father appears whom Claire saw Ronnie's deforming doppelganger in a vision as she screams.

"Ukay-Ukay"
Kayla (Ruffa Gutierrez) plans on an engagement with Harold (Zoren Legaspi). While driving with her best friend and fashion designer Basti (John Lapus), Kayla runs over a woman. As they get out of the car, they find the woman gone but see a secondhand wedding veil before they leave. The next day she visits a local boutique, finds a secondhand wedding gown and decides to buy it. Finding it damaged, she asks Basti to fix it. The gown comes to life and kills a seamstress. While Kayla and Harold have their dinner at a restaurant, she sees an old man watching her. Later, Kayla has nightmares about a ghost and an old house. The next day, the gown attacks and kills Basti.

After the gown is delivered, Kayla starts to have nightmares again. After hearing of Basti's death, the old man from the restaurant warns Kayla to stop the wedding but she disregards his warning. Kayla decides to return the gown to the store. She then later becomes suspicious of the gown that killed Basti and caused her nightmares. Harold disregards this and decides to sleep with Kayla. However, when night falls, the gown comes back and attacks Harold and Kayla, but they manage to burn it.

While searching for a church, Kayla notices a house similar to the one in her dreams, and goes inside with Harold. While investigating it, she notices a painting wherein the woman is wearing the same wedding gown that haunts her. Before the couple leave, the old man appears. Kayla, although mad at first at the old man, explains to him their current situation. The old man tells her the story of the gown. It was formerly owned by Lucia (Megan Young) At her wedding, Lucia waited for a long time for her groom, Joaquin. She eventually discovered that he married another woman and Lucia was left heartbroken. Out of anger, she killed Joaquin's bride and attempted to kill Joaquin but he accidentally stabbed her instead. Before dying, she cursed herself and her gown that she would kill every bride related to Joaquin's bloodline. Joaquin stopped being involved with women, but he had a relationship with a lady named Juanita. Before they ended their relationship, Juanita gave birth to a boy who is revealed to be Kayla's father. The old man reveals himself to be Joaquin and that he is Kayla's grandfather. Kayla is the first woman that was related to Joaquin's bloodline. Joaquin urges her to stop the wedding because the curse will never stop.

While designing a new wedding gown, Kayla becomes suspicious of her new gown, thinking it is the same one that will kill her since it has an uncanny resemblance to the old gown, but she changes her mind and decides to wear it. At the peak of their wedding, Lucia possesses Kayla and attempts to kill Harold but Joaquin arrives at the church and begins apologizing to Lucia for what he did to her, begging her to take him instead. Lucia kills Joaquin and takes his soul and herself to the afterlife.

The wedding continues and Kayla is engaged to Harold. As the guests clap for Kayla and Harold, the gown appears and walks towards them.

"Lamanglupa"
Sheila (Jennica Garcia) is interrogated by a policeman (Archie Adamos) and a social worker (Julia Clarete) regarding her missing friends.

In a flashback, she, her boyfriend Ryan (Martin Escudero), her best friend Chari (Bangs Garcia) and her childhood friend Archie (Rayver Cruz) went on a camping trip and met up with their friends Lia (Iya Villania) and twins Kiko (Felix Roco) and Pong (Dominic Roco).

The twins destroy some anthills at the campsite despite Lia's warning not to, recalling stories of dwendes or lamang lupa. They are enraged when their homes (anthills) are destroyed and seek revenge.

That night, Kiko wakes up to relieve himself. He is attacked by an unknown creature. The next morning, the friends split up to try and find him. Archie, Lia and Pong hear Kiko's voice in a cave, prompting Archie and Lia to get some climbing gear while Pong stays at the cave. Chari is separated from Ryan and Sheila and is chased by a figure. She gets lost and attempts to run, but is killed. Ryan and Shiela find her mutilated body.

Ryan and Shiela meets up with Archie and Lia. Ryan wants everyone to get away, but Archie refuses to leave the twins behind. Shiela goes with Archie, while Lia goes with Ryan. On their way back to the campsite, Ryan and Lia are killed by the creature. Archie, Sheila and Pong climb down the cave. They find Kiko but are unable to free him before he dies. The creature attacks the group and kills Pong as Archie and Shiela climb back up. The creature catches up outside, and Shiela escapes but Archie is killed attempting to fight it off.

Shiela makes it back to the campsite and attempts to escape using one of the cars. Due to her panic she is unable to start it up, causing her to be captured by the creature. It is revealed that there are two of them.

In the present time the policeman and social worker find it hard to believe her story, especially since lamang lupa are just part of folklore. Besides, Shiela never told them how she survived. As the policeman starts to tell her how she'll be facing murder charges, Shiela screams in pain. She collapses and dies with her stomach bulging as if she were pregnant. The policeman notices something moving in Shiela's stomach, from which a lamanglupa bursts out of.

Cast

Diablo
 Maja Salvador as Claire
 Mark Anthony Fernandez as Fr. Ronnie
 Gina Alajar as Tita Beth
 Joem Bascon as Fr. Paul
 Alex Castro as Jake
 Irma Adlawan as Dr. Yulo
 Janice de Belen as Nurse (Cameo) 
 Paolo Bediones as Newscaster
 Sabrina Man as Young Claire
 Frances Makil-Ignacio as Claire's Mother
 Neil Ryan Sese as Claire's Father
 Jairus Aquino as Kuya Dave

Ukay-Ukay
 Ruffa Gutierrez as Kayla
 Zoren Legaspi as Harold
 John Lapus as Basti
 Megan Young as Lucia
 Miguel Faustman as Joaquin Castillano
 Carl Guevarra as Young Joaquin
 Philip Lazaro as Renz

Lamanglupa
 Jennica Garcia as Sheila
 Rayver Cruz as Archie
 Martin Escudero as Ryan
 Iya Villania as Lia
 Dominic Roco as Pong
 Felix Roco as Kiko
 Bangs Garcia as Chari
 Archie Adamos as Policeman
 Julia Clarete as Social Worker

Accolades

See also
List of ghost films

References
 MrBundyboo - G is for Gong - Alphabreaks (Dappled Cities) YouTube.com

External links
 

2009 films
Philippine supernatural horror films
2009 horror films
Regal Entertainment films
Philippine films about revenge